John Ladds, RIBA, (22 April 1835 – 15 October 1926) was an architect best known for his work on churches and schools, very often church-affiliated schools.

Life
He was born on 22 April 1835 at Ellington, Cambridgeshire, the son of William Ladds (1798 - 1882) and Ann Inskip (1799 - 1875). He was the 8th child of 12.

He married Cecilia Townshend Kent (1832 - 1922) in St Clement Danes on 19 January 1867 and they had the following children:
Sidney Inskip Ladds (1868 - 1950) became an architect
Amy Cope Ladds (1868 - 1922)
Harriet Cecilia Ladds (1871 - 1940)
Mabel Mary Ladds (1872 - 1952)

He died on 15 October 1926 and left and estate valued at £3,560 10s 9d.

Works

From around 1871 he worked in partnership with William Henry Powell (1847 - 1900) as Ladds and Powell until Powell emigrated to South Africa around 1890.

His notable designs include:
St John's Church, Lawley, Shropshire 1865 Grade II listed
National School in Newport, Shropshire 1872
The Corn Exchange, Bedford 1872-74
Bowlee School, Rhodes near Manchester 1875
Church School, Tonge, Alkrington, Lancashire 1875
Chorley Town Hall, Lancashire 1875
Christ Church, Marton Cum Grafton, North Yorkshire 1876 Grade II listed
Kimbolton Grammar School, Cambridgeshire 1877
St James' Church, Canterbury Street, Chorley, Lancashire 1878
Chancel redecoration, Church of St John the Evangelist, Waterbeach, Cambridgeshire 1879-80 
Boxmoor Schools, Hemel Hempstead, Hertfordshire 1880
Rivington and Blackrod High School, Rivington Lane, Rivington, Bolton 1881-82
St Paul's Church, Finchley, London 1886
Queen Elizabeth's School for Girls, Barnet Hill, High Barnet, London 1890 (extensions and rebuilding)
New reredos, St Mary's Church, East Farleigh, Kent 1894
Ophthalmic Hospital, Judd Street, London 1911-12

Ladds spent his last years in the North London neighbourhood of Harringay, where he died in 1926.

His son Sidney Ladds worked as an architect to Ely Cathedral until 1950.

Sources

John Newman and Nikolaus Pevsner, Shropshire; The Buildings of England, Yale University Press, 2006, 

Architects from London
People from Harringay
1835 births
1926 deaths
English architects